Anton Levy (born October 18, 1974) is an American businessman. He is Co-President, Managing Director and head of the Global Internet and Technology sector at General Atlantic, a private equity firm based in New York City, where he has worked since 1998. In 2017, Forbes ranked Levy #26 on The Midas List.

Career and education

Anton Levy earned a Bachelor of Science in Commerce with degrees in Finance and Computer Science from the University of Virginia, and a Master of Business Administration from Columbia University. Levy graduated from both with highest honors.

Levy began his career in 1996 as an analyst and investment banker at Morgan Stanley, working with the investment bank's technology clients.

In 1998 Levy joined growth equity firm General Atlantic, with a focus on internet and technology companies. Levy was promoted to Managing Director in 2006 and today oversees the firm's global Internet & Technology sector. He also serves on the firm's Investment and Executive Committees, co-chairs it's Human Resources Committee, and chairs the Emerging Growth Investment Committee. Levy has been instrumental in a number of General Atlantic's internet & technology investments, including Alibaba in 2009, Red Ventures in 2010, Facebook in 2011, Vox Media in 2014, and Airbnb in 2015.

In November 2019, General Atlantic announced that Levy, along with colleagues Gabriel Caillaux and Martín Escobari, would serve as Co-President of the firm effective January 1, 2020.

Alibaba investment

In 2009, Levy led an investment in Chinese ecommerce site, Alibaba. The company's founder Jack Ma was seeking growth guidance from an experienced firm, and the General Atlantic team saw the potential for growth in the Chinese ecommerce industry. Alibaba went public on the New York Stock Exchange with one of the largest initial public offerings ever at $90 a share, delivering an 18x return for General Atlantic. This was one of General Atlantic's most successful investments in its 35-year history.

Forbes Midas List

Levy appeared at #45 on the Forbes Midas List, a ranking of the top technology investors, in 2021. Levy has been named to the Midas List every year since 2015. His appearances on the list were attributed to investments in Alibaba in 2014, Uber, Airbnb, Red Ventures, Crowdstrike, Snapchat, Slack, and Squarespace.

Philanthropy and community involvement

Levy is Chairman of Streetwise Partners, a nonprofit organization in New York City and Washington, D.C., that helps low-income individuals gain employment and develop careers. He also serves on the boards of University of Virginia's endowment, UVIMCO (University of Virginia Investment Management Company) and WNYC, New York's public radio station. Levy was awarded the Alan C. Greenberg Young Leadership Award at the UJA-Federation of New York Wall Street Dinner on December 10, 2018.

Corporate board memberships

Current
 A Place for Mom
 Squarespace
 Red Ventures
 Chronosphere
 Vox Media

References

External links 
StreetWise Partners website (board member page)
Vox Media Valued at Nearly $400 Million After Investment. November, 2014, New York Times article about Vox Media investment
5 Questions for Anton Levy. February, 2007, PE Hub interview with Levy
Collision Conference (Collision Blog page).
Privcap Interview - Privcap.com

1974 births
Private equity and venture capital investors
American philanthropists
American investors
Living people